Wilhelm Jelinek (born 17 March 1994) is an Austrian handball player for SG West Wien and the Austrian national team.

He participated at the 2018 European Men's Handball Championship.

Career 
Further, Wilhelm Jelinek participated with the youth national team of the 1994 vintage and twice in a youth European championship and was able to achieve 6th place in each case. In preparation for the 2014 domestic U-20 Men's European Handball Championship, Team 94, as it was called in Austria, participated in HLA play.

References

1994 births
Living people
Handball players from Vienna
Austrian male handball players